The men's high jump at the 2015 World Championships in Athletics was held at the Beijing National Stadium on 28 and 30 August.

In the trials, only nine were able to get over 2.31, so they took perfect to 2.29 to fill out the field.  In the final, only seven were able to make 2.29 and at the next height 2.33 they were down to four, Derek Drouin, Bohdan Bondarenko, Zhang Guowei and Mutaz Essa Barshim all on their first attempt.  In fact all but Barshim were perfect to that point.  Nobody could make 2.36, which left a three way tie for first and Barshim, the odd man out.  They did a fourth, jumpoff attempt at 2.36, nobody made it.  The next step lowered the bar to 2.34.  Drouin cleared it, putting do or die pressure on the others.  Neither made it giving Drouin the gold and leaving a tie for silver.

Records
Prior to the competition, the records were as follows:

Qualification standards

Schedule

Results

Qualification
Qualification: 2.31 m (Q) or at least 12 best performers (q).

Final
The final was started at 18:30

References

High jump
High jump at the World Athletics Championships